Coral is an Unincorporated community village and census-designated place in McHenry County, Illinois, United States. It was named a CDP before the 2020 census, at which time it had a population of 16.

Geography
Coral is located at  (42.21740, -88.56495). It is located at the intersections of US Highway 20, E Coral Road and W Coral Road.

Demographics

2020 census

References

Census-designated places in Illinois
Census-designated places in McHenry County, Illinois
Chicago metropolitan area